Ristantia is a group of plants in the family Myrtaceae described as a genus in 1982. The entire genus is endemic to the State of Queensland in Australia.

Species
 Ristantia gouldii Peter G. Wilson & B. Hyland -  a tree species listed as vulnerable 
 Ristantia pachysperma  (F.Muell. & F.M.Bailey) Peter G.Wilson & J.T.Waterh.
 Ristantia waterhousei Peter G.Wilson & B.Hyland

References

External links
 Ristantia image search on www.flickr.com

Myrtaceae
Myrtaceae genera
Endemic flora of Queensland